Media consumption or media diet is the sum of information and entertainment media taken in by an individual or group. It includes activities such as interacting with new media, reading books and magazines, watching television and film, and listening to radio. An active media consumer must have the capacity for skepticism, judgement, free thinking, questioning, and understanding.Media consumption is to maximize the interests of consumers.

History
For as long as there have been words and pictures, the people of the world have been consuming media. Improved technology such as the printing press has fed increased consumption. Around 1600 the camera obscura was perfected. Light was inverted through a small hole or lens from outside, and projected onto a surface or screen, creating a moving image. This new medium had a very small effect on society compared to the old ones. The development of photography in the middle 19th century made those images permanent, greatly reducing the cost of pictures. By the end of the century millions of consumers were seeing new, professionally made photographs every day.

In the 1860s mechanisms such as the zoetrope, mutoscope and praxinoscope that produced two-dimensional drawings in motion were created. They were displayed in public halls for people to observe. These new media foreshadowed the mass media consumption of later years.

Around the 1880s, the development of the motion picture camera allowed individual component images to be captured and stored on a single reel. Motion pictures were projected onto a screen to be viewed by an audience. This moving camera affected the progression of the world immensely, beginning the American film industry as well as early international movements such as German Expressionism, Surrealism and the Soviet Montage. For the first time people could tell stories on film, and distribute their works to consumers worldwide.

In the 1920s electronic television was working in laboratories, and in the 1930s hundreds of receivers were in use worldwide. By 1941 the Columbia Broadcasting System (CBS) was broadcasting two 15-minute newscasts a day to a tiny audience on its New York television station. However, the television industry did not begin to boom until the general post–World War II economic expansion. Eventually television began to incorporate color, and multiple broadcasting networks were created.

Computers were developed in the middle 20th century, and commercialized in the 1960s. Apple and other companies sold computers for hobbyists in the 1970s, and in 1981 IBM released computers intended for consumers.

On August 6, 1991, the internet and World Wide Web, long in use by computer specialists, became available to the public. This was the start of the commercialized Internet that people use today.

In 1999, Friends Reunited, the first social media site, was released to the public. Since then, Myspace, Facebook, Twitter and other social networks have been created. Facebook and Twitter are the top social media sites in terms of usage. 
Facebook has a total of 1,230,000,000 consumers while Twitter has 645,750,000. Both companies are worth billions of dollars, and continue to grow.

Overall media consumption has immensely increased over time, from the era of the introduction of motion pictures, to the age of social networks and the internet.

People involved

Media is the sum of information and entertainment media taken in by an individual or group. The first source of media was solely word of mouth. When written language was established, scrolls were passed, but mass communication was never an option. It wasn't until the printing press that media could be consumed on a high level. Johannes Gutenberg, a goldsmith and businessman from the mining town of Mainz in southern Germany printing press. His technology allowed books, newspapers, and flyers to be printed and distributed on a mass level.

The first newspaper written on paper was done by Benjamin Harris in the British-American Colonies. The invention of a newspaper was one of the most influential pieces in media consumption history, because it pertained to everyone.

Eventually communication reached an electronic state, and the telegraph was invented. Harrison Dyar, who sent electrical sparks through chemically treated paper tape to burn dots and dashes, invented the first telegraph in the USA. The telegraph was the first piece of equipment that allowed users to send electronic messages. A more developed version came from Samuel Morse, whose telegraph printed code on tape and was operated using a keypad and an earpiece. The pattern of communication soon became known as Morse code.

Inventors Elisha Gray and Alexander Graham Bell both independently designed the telephone. The telephone was simple enough for everyone to use and didn't require learning a code.

Soon after the telephone came the radio. Combining technology from both the telegraph and telephone, Guglielmo Marconi sent and received his first radio signal in 1895.

Finally in 1947, after a long period of development, television exploded as a medium. Not one person is responsible for the creation of the television, but Marvin Middlemark invented "rabbit ears" in 1930, which allowed for televisions to be a commercial product. The television has by far been the most influential consumed media, and allowed news to spread on a visual level.

In 1976, Apple created the first consumer computer. The computer was the start of mass written communication using email. Apple continues to be a leading company in computer use.

In 1998, the first ever social media site SixDegrees.com was created by Andrew Weinreich. It enabled users to upload a profile and make friends with other users. Shortly later in 1999, Friends Reunited was created by Steve and Julie Pankhurst and friend Jason Porter

Sites like MySpace created by Tom Anderson gained prominence in the early 2000s. By 2006, Facebook created by Mark Zuckerberg and Twitter created by Jack Dorsey both became available to users throughout the world. These sites remain some of the most popular social networks on the Internet.

Increase

Among other factors, a person's access to media technology affects the amount and quality of his or her intake. In the United States, for instance, "U.C. San Diego scientists in 2009 estimated the 'average' American consumes 34 gigabytes of media a day." The amount of media consumption among individuals is increasing as new technologies are created. According to phys.org, a new study done by a researcher at the San Diego Supercomputer Center at the University of California, says that by 2015, the sum of media asked for and delivered to consumers on mobile devices and their homes would take more than 15 hours a day to see or hear, an amount equivalent to watching nine DVDs' worth of data per person per day.

With social media networks rapidly growing such as Instagram, Facebook, and Twitter, our world of media consumption is reaching a younger and younger age group, making our consumption that much larger as a country. With mobile devices such as smartphones, news, entertainment, shopping and buying are all now at the tip of our fingers, anytime, anywhere.

Positive effects
There are a number of positive effects of media consumption. Television can have positive effects on children as they are growing up. Shows like Sesame Street teach valuable lessons to children in developmental stages, such as math, the alphabet, kindness, racial equality, and cooperation. Dora the Explorer introduces foreign language to children of all backgrounds in a fun, cooperative environment.

Mass media has a huge grasp on today's adolescents.  Many young people use different types of social media daily.  Mass media can be used to socialize adolescents from around the world and can help to give them a fundamental understanding of social norms.

Media relating to advertising can also have a positive effect. Some alcohol manufacturers are known to spend at least ten percent of their budget on warnings about the dangers of drinking and driving. Also, studies show that milk consumption (though controversial) shot up in children fifteen years of age and younger due to print and broadcast advertisements.

Many video games can also have positive effects. Games like Wii Tennis and Wii Fit improve hand-eye coordination as well as general mental and physical health.

Video games, including shooting games, may positively impact a child's learning, as well as physical and mental health and social skills. Even games rated for mature audiences have been found to be beneficial to the development of children according to a study that was published by the American Psychological Association (APA). The study showed that there is a need to look at the positive effects as well as the negative ones. When a child plays video games, they naturally develop problem-solving skills. Strategic video games, such as role-playing games, release statistics that the more intense game play improved in problem solving skills and there is a significant rise in school grades as well, according to a study that was taken over a several year span but was published in 2013. The study also showcased that the creativity of children was also enhanced by playing all genres of video games, including mature rated games. Research revealed that video games benefit children significantly more than other sources of technology.

The internet itself is an overwhelmingly useful resource for people of all ages, effectively serving as a personal library for any who access it. The sheer volume of educational websites, information and services offered are so immense that research has become a far easier task than it was in any previous period in human history. Social media has provided invaluable benefits for people over the course of its lifetime, and has served as an incredibly effective method of interacting and communicating with others in nearly every part of the world.

Media consumption has proven to serve as an indispensable asset in the educational field, serving both instructors and students alike. Instructors and students consume media for school curricula in Ontario.  Media literacy is prominent amongst the youth who have essentially been born into an era where media is a global driving force.  When a student learns to approach media sources with a critical lens, it can be observed that all forms of media have no sense of neutrality. Students who consume media are capable of questioning the validity of the media they are exposed to, in turn developing their own sense of critical thinking. To broaden their comprehension skills, students often find it useful to question an author's purpose, the reasoning for the placement of specific images or motifs, the representation of content and its meaning to individuals, and the effects of the media on individual and societal thinking. Media related to learning is typically considered a source as well as a tool. Since its start, many have successfully used Rosetta Stone (software) to assist in the process of learning a new language. Rosetta Stone is a source compatible with several platforms i.e. (iPad, Tablet, Phone Apps Websites).

Negative effects
Media consumption can have a wide range of negative behavioral and emotional effects. There are many instances of violence in movies, television, video games and websites which can affect one's level of aggression. These violent depictions can desensitize viewers to acts of violence and can also provoke mimicking of the acts. Since violence is so rampant in media, viewers believe they live in a more violent world than they actually do.

The reach of media is expanding globally and with this television has become a vice around the world. Television addiction has been labeled as the plug in drug since 1977. Over the years televisions are now located in almost every home, according to most recent estimates taken by Nielsen in the U.S. alone there are 116.4 million T.V. homes

Television can have a negative impact on adolescents and cause them to behave in a manner that is not part of normal social norm. In an article about media violence on society it states that extensive TV viewing among adolescents and young adults is associated with subsequent aggressive acts. Programs that portray violent acts can change an adolescent's view on violence and this may lead them to develop aggressive behavior.  These shows usually portray a person who commits a crime or resorts to violence.  They also show that these people go unpunished for their crime, creating the notion that crime is something a person can get away with.  Studies show that 65% of people between the age of 8 to 18 have a television in their room. The average high-schooler watches, on average, 14 hours of television a week. Excessive television viewing and computer game playing has also been associated with many psychiatric symptoms, especially emotional and behavioral symptoms, somatic complaints, attention problems such as hyperactivity, and family interaction problems.

When adolescents watch television for long periods of time they spend less time being active and engaged in physical activity. Many adolescents who spend large amounts of time watching television see actors as role models and try to emulate them by trying to be like them this can also have a negative impact on people's body images, mostly women. After seeing beautiful and thinner than average women in the media, viewers may feel worse about themselves and sometimes develop eating disorders. Some believe that the reason obesity rates have greatly increased in the last 20 years is due to increased media consumption. This is due to the fact that children are spending much more time playing video games and watching television than exercising.
Social media is said to also cause anxiety and depression. Research suggests that young people who spend more than 2 hours per day on social media are more likely to report poor mental health, including psychological distress.

Numerous studies have also shown that media consumption has a significant association with poor sleep quality. Television and computer game exposure affect children's sleep and deteriorate verbal cognitive performance.

Another problem that has developed due to increased media consumption is that people are becoming less independent. With text messaging and social media, people want instant gratification from their friends and often feel hurt if they do not receive an immediate response. Instead of having self-validation, people often need validation from others. Another issue with independence is that since children frequently get cellphones when they are very young, they are always connected and never truly alone. Today, many children do not have the rite of passage of being on their own because they can always call their parents if they need help or are frightened.

Minorities are often put in a negative light in the media as well, with blacks being portrayed as criminals, Hispanics portrayed as illegal aliens, and people from the Middle East portrayed as terrorists. Research has shown that consuming much media with headlines that depict minorities in negative ways can affect how people think.

Effects on Self-Esteem 
Media has played a huge role in society for years in selling people on the expectations of how an ideal male and female body should look. These images of the "ideal body" can have a very negative effect on self-esteem in both men and women. These images can play significant role in eating disorders in men and women as well. The idea of body comparison goes back to Festinger's (1954) Social Comparison Theory. Festinger argues that individuals make body comparisons in areas for which they relate. If someone who is over weight and is an environment that focuses on health, thinness, or body images (e.g. the gym or the beach) they may be more likely to see thinness as an ideal that can increase dissatisfaction with their own body. The more a person engages in body comparison, the more likely they may struggle with low self-esteem and a negative body image. Women are sold to believe that to be beautiful, they must be a size zero and have long legs.  Men are sold the notion that they must big biceps and zero body fat. Reading magazines with images of toned muscular men has been reported to lower body and self-esteem in men and they start worrying more about their own health and physical fitness.

Social media 
The amount of time spent on social media can inform people about their self-esteem.  Research has shown that individuals with lower self-esteem may have an easier time expressing themselves on social media rather than in the real world. Many people use metrics such as how many people are following them and likes to measure acceptance or rejection from peers. One study from the Journal of Experimental Social Psychology, argues that individuals who feel accepted and part of the "in crowd" have a higher sense of self-esteem than those who do not feel as though they are a part of these crowds.

Semiotics of American youth media consumption
American youth have personal television sets, laptops, iPods and cell phones all at their disposal. They spend more time with media than any single activity other than sleeping.  As of 2008, the average American ages 8 to 18 reported more than 6 hours of daily media use. The growing phenomenon of "media multitasking"—using several forms of media at the same time—multiplies that figure to 8.5 hours of media exposure daily. Media exposure begins early, typically increases until children begin school, then climbs to a peak of almost 8 hours daily among 11 and 12-year-old children. Media exposure is positively related to risk-taking behaviors and is negatively related to personal adjustment and school performance.

Of teenagers ages 12 to 17 in 2014, 78% had a cell phone, and 47% of those owned smartphones. 23% of teens owned a tablet computer and 93% had a computer or access to one at home. Of teenagers ages 14 to 17, 74% accessed the Internet on mobile devices occasionally. One in four teens were mostly cell phone users, consuming a majority of their media with applications on their phone.

Media consumption, particularly social media consumption, plays a major role in the socialization and social behaviors of adolescents. Socializing through media differs from socializing through school, community, family, and other social functions. Since adolescents typically have greater control over their media choices than over other social situations face-to-face, many develop self-socialization patterns. This behavior manifests itself actively in personal social development and outcomes due to the vast array of choices made available through social media. Adolescents have the ability to choose media that best suits their personalities and preferences, which in turn create youth that have a skewed view of the world and limited social interaction skills. Socialization can consequently grow increasingly difficult for youth. Media, parents and peers may each convey conflicting messages to adolescents. With vastly differing views of how to approach various situations, confusion can be apparent and youth may avoid or internalize their social weaknesses.

Social semiotics represent a significant role in how adolescents learn and employ social interaction. Impressionable adolescents regularly imitate the sign systems seen in the media. These semiotic systems affect their behavior through connotations, narratives, and myths. Adolescents are shaped by the sign systems in the media they consume. For example, many young girls in the 1990s dressed and acted like the Spice Girls, a pop band that gathered prolific and critical acclaim at the time. Similarly, boy bands created a trend of many teenage boys frosting their hair in the early 2000s. With more exposure to the media and images of models, young women are more likely to conform to the ideals of specific body images. Anorexia, bulimia and models smoking convey to girls that a feminine person is thin, beautiful, and must do certain things to her body to be attractive. A code of femininity (see media and gender) implies today that a "true" woman is thin, girlish, frail, passive, and focused on serving others.  On the other hand, the code of masculinity for a young males raised within the past several decades may include the ideals of profusely individualistic and self-sufficient natures, oft personified in film characters such as cowboys and outlaw bikers. The images, myths, and narratives of these ideas imply that a "true" man is a relentless problem solver, physically strong, emotionally inexpressive, and at times, a daredevil with little regard for societal expectations and the law of the land.

The never ceasing flood of signs, images, narratives, and myths surrounding consumers of media have the capability to influence behavior through the use of codes. Codes are maps of meaning, systems of signs that are used to interpret behavior. Codes connect semiotic systems of meaning with social structure and values. The idea of being judged on femininity or clothing relates to experiences later in life, including job interviews and the emphasis placed on reaching financial success.

Media consumption has become an integral part of modern culture, and has shaped younger generations through socialization and the interpretations provided for the signs and world around them.

Effect on public attitudes regarding crime and justice

Media consumption affects the public's perception of the justice system through the relationship of fear regarding crime, the perceived effectiveness of law enforcement, and the general attitudes about punishment for crime.  The justice system has been consistently portrayed in mass media in negative tandem through the portrayal of criminals, deviants, and law enforcement officials, in turn affecting their overall perception by the public.

A 2003 study by Dowler showed the effects of media consumption influences public attitudes regarding crime and justice.  In this study, a relationship between media and crime was found to be dependent on characteristics of the message and receiving audience, where substantial amounts of local crimes reported raised fear, while lower crime amounts lead to a feeling of safety. George Gerbner's empirical studies of the impact of media consumption discovered that television viewers of crime-based shows are more fearful of crime than those who are not consuming that type of media.

A study conducted by Chermak, McGarrell, & Gruenewald focused on media coverage of police misconduct, producing results where greater consumption of media portraying dishonesty amongst law enforcement led to increasing confirmation bias in the direction of the officer's guilt.

See also

References

Further reading
1990s
 
 

2000s
 
 
 
 
 
 
 
 
 
 
 
 
 
 
 
 
 

2010s

Media diets of notable people
 . (Notables include Barney Frank, Aaron Sorkin, David Brooks, Clay Shirky, Peggy Noonan)
 
 
 . (Lists of titles in "personal libraries of famous readers" such as Harry Houdini, Ralph Ellison, Susan B. Anthony)

External links

 
 

Mass media
Media bias
Reading (process)
Metaphors referring to food and drink
Information society